"I Just Can't Wait to Be King" is a song written by Elton John (music) and Tim Rice (lyrics) for the Disney animated feature film The Lion King (1994). The song is performed by American actor and singer Jason Weaver as the singing voice of young Simba, with English actor Rowan Atkinson and American actress Laura Williams providing supporting vocals in their roles as Zazu and the singing voice of young Nala, respectively.

The song was featured in the 2019 film adaptation, performed by JD McCrary, Shahadi Wright Joseph, and John Oliver.

Analysis
The song is "An ode to youthful arrogance, invincibility and above all, impatience".

Critical reception
The New York Times Film Reviews 1993–1994 deemed the song to be derivative as well as "cute, lilting [and] safe", and likened the song to Michael Jackson singing "Under the Sea". The Cavalier Daily also compared the song to those from The Little Mermaid, and Popdust compared it to Billy Joel's "River of Dreams".

The New York Times Theater Reviews 1997–1998 felt that the song was "conventionally comic and upbeat". Lakeland Ledger wrote that it is a "dazzling Busby Berkeley-style dancefest" with a "Rockettes kickline". It has been described as "strutting", "bouncy", "grand", and a "hubris-filled fantasy song". News.com deemed it the underdog song of The Lion King, adding "this showstopper about the future didn't get the accolades its brethren received."

Less favorable reviews have describe the song as "irritating" and not very "thematically rich". Popdust ranked the song 5 out of 6 songs in the film, and BoingBoing listed it as the 11th best "I Want" song in the Disney repertoire. The Cavalier Daily deemed the Elton John reworking "uneventful and boring".

Certifications

Context

In film
"I Just Can't Wait to Be King" is a large contrast from the film's non-musical segments; the onset of the song sees a change from a neutral color palette. The song is performed near the beginning of the film by a young Simba and Nala as to enunciate Simba's desires to become King. It is a prelude to Simba's lost innocence, being tricked into thinking he killed his father, his leaving Pride Rock, and attempt to forget his past.

Direct-to-video prequel
It also appears in DisneyToon's 2004 direct-to-video followup The Lion King 1½. Timon and Pumbaa are disturbed by some noise from outside of their home, which is actually Simba, Nala, and the animals singing this musical number. Timon is angry and hits the leg of an elephant supporting the tower of animals with a stick. The elephant jumps in surprise and causes the tower to collapse, explaining why it collapses in the original film. Timon and Pumbaa's home is ruined by this event.

In musical
The song appears in the Broadway show and is performed by Scott Irby-Ranniar, Kajuana Shuford, and Geoff Hoyle on the 1997 Original Cast Recording. In the Spanish language version of The Lion King, "I Just Can't Wait to be King" was performed by Mexican singer and entertainer Kalimba. Elton John himself also recorded his own version of the song for the film's soundtrack.

Cover versions
 Performed live by the ska/funk band Suburban Legends, most often when performing at Disneyland's Tomorrowland Terrace, but occasionally while on tour as well. Vincent Walker sings the part of Simba, while Brian Klemm sings the part of Zazu. The song appears on their 2012 album, Day Job.
 Pop star Aaron Carter remixed the song on Disneymania.
 Allstar Weekend remade the song for DisneyMania 7.
 The Brazilian musical group “Exaltasamba” recorded a Portuguese version of “I Just Can’t Wait to Be King” (O que eu quero mais é ser rei, roughly translated as “What I want most is to be king”) in a samba style to the CD Disney Adventures in Samba.
 Brian Wilson covered the song for his album In the Key of Disney.
 In 2015, it was covered by members of SM Entertainment trainee team SM Rookies on the Disney Channel Korea show Mickey Mouse Club.

References

External links
  (on Disney's official channel)

1994 songs
Songs from The Lion King (franchise)
Elton John songs
Disney Renaissance songs
Songs with lyrics by Tim Rice
Songs with music by Elton John